Marrilla Station, often referred to as Marrilla, is a pastoral lease that operates as a sheep station.

The station is composed of two blocks, one on the eastern side and one to the west meeting at a single point in the middle. The eastern portion is made up of sand dunes and sandy plains, the western block is made up of low hills and plains that support spinifex and bluebush. The property is capable of supporting flock of 13,100 sheep in a good season.

In 1934 the property was owned by the Marilla Station Company, a partnership between Amedio Ferdinand Marchetti and Hercules Carl Lingstone. The partnership was dissolved in 1934 with Lingstone retaining ownership of the property.

A bushfire started at Marrilla in 2011 and burned toward Yanrey Station. A bushfire alert saying the fire threatened lives and properties was issued.

See also
 List of pastoral leases in Western Australia

References

Pastoral leases in Western Australia
Stations (Australian agriculture)
Shire of Carnarvon